Club de Fútbol Astros is a Mexican football team who will be part of the inaugural year of the Liga de Ascenso.  They reside in Mexico City, Mexico |. The club currently places in the Segunda División de México and would not be eligible for promotion, since the club does not count with a stadium with a capacity of 15,000.

Current roster
 Updated on August 29, 2011.

Footnotes

External links
Tercera divicion

Football clubs in Mexico City